is a Japanese football player who plays as a midfielder for Azul Claro Numazu.

Club statistics
Updated to 23 February 2018.

References

External links

Profile at Azul Claro Numazu

1986 births
Living people
Nara Gakuen University alumni
Association football people from Osaka Prefecture
Sportspeople from Osaka
Japanese footballers
J2 League players
J3 League players
Japan Football League players
FC Gifu players
Fagiano Okayama players
Oita Trinita players
Azul Claro Numazu players
Association football midfielders